Loki was the code name for a cancelled home computer developed at Sinclair Research during the mid-1980s. The name came from the Norse god Loki, god of mischief and thieves. Loki was based on the ZX Spectrum, but intended to rival the Amiga for video games.

Loki followed two earlier, aborted research projects from Sinclair: the 68008-based SuperSpectrum home computer (cancelled in 1982) and the LC3 game console (cancelled in 1983).

Design 

According to an article published in Sinclair User magazine, Loki was to have a 7 MHz Z80H CPU, a minimum of 128 KiB of RAM and two custom chips providing much enhanced video and audio capabilities compared to the ZX Spectrum, but with a compatibility mode.  The video chip, referred to as the Rasterop chip, would  have blitter-type functionality and three different modes: 512×256 pixels with 16 colours, 256×212 with 256 colours, or 256×212 with 64 colours and two bits per pixel used for "blitter objects".  Comprehensive peripheral support was also claimed, including MIDI, lightpen, joystick and floppy disk. A version of the SuperBASIC language from the Sinclair QL was to be provided in place of the old Sinclair BASIC for the ZX Spectrum and support for the CP/M operating system was also intended.  On top of this, the computer would cost as little as £200.

Another Spectrum magazine, Crash, poured scorn on the report in Sinclair User, dismissing the design as "dreamware" in the opinion of an ex-Sinclair designer they consulted, analysing the implied components and costs, and adding, "It may be fun to dream about Loki, but the fact is that it won't appear, and nor will anything like it." This was the rationale, according to Crash Technical Editor Simon Goodwin:

History 

When Amstrad bought out Sinclair's computer business in 1986, the project was cancelled.

Martin Brennan and John Mathieson, two Sinclair engineers, took the Loki concept with them and founded Flare Technology.  There they worked on the cancelled Konix Multisystem game console, then later worked with Atari Corporation on the Panther (cancelled) and Jaguar systems.   According to Jaguar developer Andrew Whittaker, two other Sinclair employees, Bruce Gordon and Alan Miles, who went on to form Miles Gordon Technology, also used some of the designs in the SAM Coupé.

References

External links 
 USENET posting by Rupert Goodwins in comp.sys.sinclair mentioning Loki

Sinclair computers and derivatives
Sinclair Research
Cancelled projects